The 1975 National Challenge Cup was the 62nd edition of the United States Soccer Football Association's annual open soccer championship. Teams from the North American Soccer League declined to participate.  The Maccabi Los Angeles defeated the New York Inter-Giuliana in the final game.

Bracket

References

Sources
Boston Globe
Los Angeles Times
New York Times
The Plain Dealer
St.Louis Post-Dispatch
San Francisco Chronicle

External links
 Full details 1975 U.S. Open Cup – TheCup.us

Lamar Hunt U.S. Open Cup
U.S. Open Cup